John Callahan (December 16, 1865 – May 10, 1956) was an American educator.

Born in Golden's Bridge, New York, he moved with his family to Prescott, Wisconsin. He went to the public schools and did private study while working as a bricklayer. Callahan received his Wisconsin teacher's certificate, in 1894, and taught in rural schools. Callahan served as school principal and also served as superintendent of public schools in Menasha, Wisconsin. Callahan served as Superintendent of Public Instruction of Wisconsin from 1921 to 1949. Callahan died at his home in Madison, Wisconsin.

Notes

1865 births
1956 deaths
People from Lewisboro, New York
People from Prescott, Wisconsin
People from Menasha, Wisconsin
Educators from Wisconsin
Superintendents of Public Instruction of Wisconsin
Educators from New York (state)